Čerčany is a municipality and village in Benešov District if the Central Bohemian Region in the Czech Republic. It has about 2,900 inhabitants.

Administrative parts
The village of Vysoká Lhota is an administrative part of Čerčany.

Geography
It lies in the Benešov Uplands. The Sázava River flows through the municipality.

History
The first written mention of Čerčany is from 1356. The turning point was the construction of the railway from Prague to České Budějovice, which was completed in 1871, and Čerčany became a railway junction thanks to it. This contributed to the growth of the settlement, which at that time was part of Lštění. Čerčany has become a popular holiday resort. In 1919, Čerčany became an independent municipality.

Transport
The I/3 road, which is part of the European route E55, passes through Čerčany.

Čerčany is located on the railway line Prague–Benešov. It is also the starting point of a railway line to Ledeč nad Sázavou.

Sights
In Vysoká Lhota is the Vysoká Lhota Castle. It was first documented in 1550. Baroque reconstruction took place in the 1740s. Today there is a museum of carriages and wagons, and an exhibition about the history of the castle.

Notable people
Vlastimil Horváth (born 1977), singer

References

External links

Villages in Benešov District